Take Care, Your Highness! is a 1985 Hong Kong historical drama television series produced by TVB and starring Andy Lau in the title role of Kin-lung Emperor, the sixth emperor of the Qing Dynasty. The series focuses on the power struggle in the Imperial Qing Palace, telling the story of righteous folks while also presenting a hesitant love story.

Plot
Prince Po (Andy Lau) possesses extraordinary talent but has an uninhibited nature, which worries his father Yung-ching Emperor (Lau Siu-ming) as he cannot decide whether Po can inherit his throne and promote the Manchu Foundation. In order to pave the way for Po as his successor, Yung-ching breaks up Po's romance with Suen Fuk-yu (Carina Lau), an ethnic Han Chinese, and declares her a Princess, which makes her become Po's younger adoptive-sister. Yung-ching also declares the daughter of Lee Wing-po, the most powerful man of the Eight Banners, as Crown Princess. Although Yung-ching have broke them up, Po and Fuk-yu still date secretly.

Not long after, Yung-ching was assassinated and Prince Po inherits his throne, becoming the Kin-lung Emperor. Because Kin-lung did not understand statecraft, plus the chaotic rebellion of the Miao people, he releases his uncle, the 14th Prince Wan-tai (Paul Chun), who once failed the fight for the throne against Yung-ching. Wan-tai regains his position and helps Kin-lung with government affairs and made it very well organized. However, Wan-tai's ambition comes up again, and desires to seize the throne. Wan-tai then spread rumors everywhere citing Kin-lung has left Beijing to trace his origin. Wan-tai awaits his opportunity to seize the throne. Kin-lung travels to the south in disguise as a civilian and there, he becomes acquainted with Chow Yat-ching (Ha Yu), Tan-ka Mui and Chiu Nam-sing (Sean Lau), whom are members of the Anti-Qing society "Chung Yee Tong". After a thorough investigation, Kin-lung was able to prove that he is indeed a Manchu and knows that Wan-tai is up to no good. After Kin-lung's identity was exposed, the members of "Chung Yee Tong" turned against him and Kin-lung can must reverse the situation to resolve the crisis both inside and outside of the palace.

Cast
 Note: Some of the characters' names are in Cantonese romanisation.

Andy Lau as Kin-lung Emperor / Prince Po (乾隆帝/寶親王)
Danny Poon as 6th Prince (六皇子)
Chan Chung-lin
Joseph Lee as Fu-hang (傅恒)
Lau Siu-ming as Yung-ching Emperor (雍正帝)
Yeung Chak-lam as Fu Hung-po (傅紅保)
Felix Lok as Ngok-yee-tai (鄂爾泰)
Law Kwok-wai
Teresa Ha as Empress Hao-sing-hin / Consort Hei (孝聖憲皇后/熹妃)
Leung Kit-fong
Suen Kwai-hing
Cho Chai
Law Lan as Granny (嬷嬷)
Pui Man
Cheung Man-kwong
Ho Lai-nam
Ng Pok-kwan
Lam Man-wai
Lam Choi-lin
Carina Lau as Suen Fuk-yu (孫福如)
Chan On-ying as Kam Lin (金蓮)
Shally Tsang as Empress Xiaoxianchun
Yu Tin-wai
Fok Kit-ching
Mak Ho-wai
Luk Ying-hong
Ha Yu as Chow Yat-ching (周日清)
Paul Chun as Prince Wan-tai (允禵)
Lai Pik-kwong
Lau Kwok-sing
Sean Lau as Chiu Nam-sing (趙南星)
Fok Ka-lai
Chan Siu-wah
Kwok Fung
Ho Kwong-lun
Leung Siu-chau
Lee Wan-kwong
Chan Wai-yu
Sit Choi-ha
Soh Hang-suen
Amy Hu
Tang Yu-chiu
Lee Kwok-ping
Wilson Tsui
Pau Wai-leung
Tony Leung
Wong Sze-yan
Cheng Siu-ping
Ng Yuen-fan
Law Chun-piu
Ng Wai-san
Tam Yat-ching
Ma Wai-ling
Wong Yat-fei
Leung Chi-fong
Koo Po-lai
Maggie Shiu as Princess Fragrance (香香公主)
Mak Chi-wan
Ma Hing-sang
Lau Miu-ching
Ho Kwai-lam
Cheung Chi-keung
Chan Po-wan
Yuen Pui-yee
Liu Ching-han
Lau Man-chun
Yip Tin-hang
So Hon-sang
Ng Chau-kuen
Ho Pik-kin
Cheng Hung-wai
Lee Hoi-sang
Chan Yiu-keung

See also
Andy Lau filmography

External links
Take Care, Your Highness! at Douban

Hong Kong television series
TVB dramas
1985 Hong Kong television series debuts
1985 Hong Kong television series endings
Television series set in the Qing dynasty
Costume drama television series
Serial drama television series
1980s Hong Kong television series
Cantonese-language television shows